Pachikapalam or Pachikapallam is a village and a Subdivisions of India in Chittoor district in the state of Andhra Pradesh in India.

Geography
It has an average elevation of 266 meters (875 feet).

References 

Villages in Chittoor district